Sergio Méndez Arceo (28 October 1907 in Tlalpan – 5 February 1992 in Morelos) was a Mexican Roman Catholic bishop, activist and human rights supporter. A product of a wealthy family, Méndez Arceo's father was a successful lawyer and his uncle was a prominent archbishop believed to be involved in the church-state conflict of the 1920s. Méndez Arceo graduated from the Pontifical Gregorian University of Rome and served as a Seminary professor in Mexico. He became Roman Catholic Bishop of Cuernavaca, Morelos,  in 1953 and served in that capacity until 1983.

Basic ecclesial communities
Sergio Méndez Arceo was Bishop of the Cuernavaca diocese in the Mexican state of Morelos. He is often cited as the force behind the growth of basic ecclesial communities (CEB) in Mexico during the 1970s. The first groups arose in Mexico in 1967 under Méndez Arceo, and by the 1970s CEBs were operating throughout Mexico, 70% in rural regions with the remainder in working-class urban areas. Méndez Arceo and the CEB's often removed the emphasis on the church's hierarchy, instead pushing for a greater dialogue between church leaders, non-clergy members and the members of the surrounding community. Members of the CEB's would meet with priests and discuss social, political and economic issues they felt needed attention. Following the meetings, priests would confer with Méndez Arceo weekly to discuss possible solutions to the issues of the members of the community. The growth of CEBs in Mexico is often cited as a reason for Cuernavaca being the focal point of renovation in the church. Méndez Arceo is quoted as saying;

CIDOC
Méndez Arceo supported Ivan Illich, an Austrian philosopher, in setting up the Intercultural Documentation Center (CIDOC) at his diocese in Cuernavaca in 1961. Illich is stated as having pronounced to Méndez Arceo; "I would like to start, under your auspices, a center for de-Yankeefication." The Center was a research center and offered language courses to missionaries from North America and to volunteers of the Alliance for Progress program. Illich however was stated as having the goal of countering the participation of the Vatican in the "modern development" of the Third World. He believed that the Church should view itself as guest of the host country and, through the center, relayed this belief. The conservative members of the Church denounced the school, and for a time forbade clergy from studying at the location. The ban however was altered following Méndez Arceo's trip to Rome where he pleaded the case for the CIDOC. It was decided that priests and nuns may study at the CIDOC as long as their superiors monitored their progress.

Liberation theology
Sergio Méndez Arceo is a believer in liberation theology, a belief which has led him to be named the "Red Bishop" and a "scandalous supporter of socialism". In 1970 Méndez Arceo stated "Christianity and socialism can co-exist" and he encouraged then president of Mexico Luis Echeverría to form a committee of notable citizens to examine Mexico's most serious social and economic problems. Echeverría viewed Arceo as the foremost proponent of liberation theology and favored his emphasis on redistribution of wealth to the poor. Echeverría believed the clergy could help the people of Mexico learn the best means of organizing themselves in a capitalist society. The means of organizing in Arceo's view was labor unions, which he viewed as "essential to the base of community organizing." For the workers whom Arceo provided support for in his Sunday homilies, his title was Don Sergio, an honorific title in  the Spanish language.

In April 1972, Méndez Arceo attended the Christians for Socialism conference in Santiago de Chile; he was the only member of the Mexican episcopate to attend. The conference was the first continent-wide gathering of its kind, composed of Catholics and Protestants. It is stated the conference members were composed of the most radical of those involved in liberal theology and that they attempted to find a synthesis between Christianity and socialism. The gathering was soon after banned by the Chilean episcopate. 

Upon his retirement Méndez Arceo founded the Center for Meetings and Dialogue (CED) in Cuernavaca to serve as an umbrella organization for other social and activist programs in the state of Morelos. The role of the CED was to help assist in the continuation of his life work in the field of liberation theology. Today, the CED "provides a regional mechanism for progressive popular organizations" as well as housing statewide meetings in various fields such as women's empowerment, human rights, education, and environmental protection.

Human rights
Sergio Méndez Arceo was an advocate of the Vatican II principles, which moved for changes in ritual distribution of the sacraments, deemphasis on saints, more studying of the bible, and sociological studies to aid ecclesiastical organization. Méndez Arceo attempted unsuccessfully to have the Mexican Conference of Bishops explore the violent suppression of the student movements in 1968, known as Mexico 68. As an individual without the support of the other bishops, Méndez Arceo assisted the imprisoned students, often called political prisoners, following the Tlatelolco Plaza massacre. In January 1970 he informed his fellow bishops of the condition of those prisoners; the bishops made no references to the massacre itself or the outcome, in keeping with its nonconfrontational stance toward the government at the time. Méndez Arceo was also involved in other social movements in Mexico such as striking Cuernavaca workers and guerrillas from Guerrero. The inaction by the episcopate, against what was viewed as rampant social repression, is believed to be what sparked many individual clergy and Jesuits, and the episcopate's social secretariat, to shift its emphasis from schools for the elite to social action programs.

Méndez Arceo visited Cuba where he received the Orden de la Solidaridad from Fidel Castro for his "merit in the struggle against imperialism, colonialism, neocolonialism and other forms of exploitation." Following Méndez Arceo's trip to Cuba, he began supporting "democratic socialism."

Criticism
Some say that Sergio Méndez Arceo's actions and views made him too controversial, to the point that it limited his ability to form collegiality with other Mexican bishops and the episcopate; also that he politicized his diocese and its communities, and in doing so was opposed to the government. Roderic Ai Camp in Crossing Swords: Politics and Religion in Mexico states that this is wrong, and asserts "empirical data ... states that religion in Cuernavaca is associated with increased PRI support." The Institutional Revolutionary Party (PRI), being the then ruling party.

In 1983 when Méndez Arceo retired, the Vatican under Pope John Paul II sent unsympathetic bishops to reverse much of Méndez Arceo's work. Juan Jesús Posadas Ocampo became bishop of the diocese of Cuernavaca.

It later become known that the United States Federal Bureau of Investigation (FBI) produced a report on Méndez Arceo stating he was friendly to the Farabundo Martí National Liberation Front (FMLN) of El Salvador and the Sandinista National Liberation Front(FSLN) of Nicaragua, which took power in 1979 following the collapse of the Somoza regime. The FBI further alleged Méndez Arceo's diocese collected intelligence, bought and sold guns, and served as couriers for communist guerrillas of El Salvador. Méndez Arceo was further accused of being contacted by the Soviet Union Committee for State Security (KGB) and Cuban General Intelligence Directorate (DGI).

In an article in the Catholic periodical The Athanasian, it is claimed that Arceo was in fact a crypto-Freemason; and that there were and are many more like him in the Vatican hierarchy.

See also
 List of people from Morelos, Mexico

Further reading
Loustaunau, Esteban. "Sergio Méndez Arceo." Encyclopedia of Mexico. Chicago: Fitzroy Dearborn 1997, 791-92.
Macín, Raúl. Méndez Arceo, político o cristiano? Mexico City: Posada 1972.
Suárez, Luis. Cuernavaca ante el vaticano. Mexico City: Grijalbo 1970.
Videla, Gabriela. Sergio Méndez Arceo: Un señor obispo. Mexico City: Nuevomar 1984.

References

1907 births
1992 deaths
People from Mexico City
Liberation theologians
Participants in the Second Vatican Council
Christian Peace Conference members
20th-century Roman Catholic bishops in Mexico
People from Cuernavaca
People from Morelos